TP may refer to:

Arts and entertainment

Music
 Test pressing, of a vinyl record
 Tonic parallel (Tp and tP), in music theory

 TP (Teddy Pendergrass album), 1980
 TP (Tony Parker album), 2007
 Tonus Peregrinus (vocal ensemble), a British group
 Either of two R&B albums by R. Kelly:
 TP-2.com, 2000
 TP.3 Reloaded, 2005

Other media
 The Legend of Zelda: Twilight Princess, a Nintendo video game
 Test pattern or test card, a broadcast television signal 
 The Tomorrow People, a British science fiction television series

Businesses and organizations

Technology brands and businesses
 TP-Link, a global manufacturer of computer networking products
 TP Vision, a subsidiary of TPV Technology, Amsterdam, Netherlands
 Telekomunikacja Polska (now Orange Polksa), a Polish telecommunications provider 
 ThinkPad, Lenovo's line of business laptop computers and tablets

Transport businesses
 TAP Air Portugal (IATA airline code: TP)
 Trans Pacific Railroad, United States
 Texas and Pacific Railway, United States
 TP Harbor Tug

Other businesses and organizations
 TP ICAP, a London-based financial-services firm
 Teleperformance, a French-based business-process outsourcer
 Terre et Peuple, a cultural association in France
 Travis Perkins, a British building materials supplier

People
 T. P. McKenna (1929–2011), an Irish actor
 T. P. Rajeevan (born 1959), an Indian novelist
 Teddy Pendergrass (1950-2010), an American singer

Places
 Portuguese Timor (), a defunct territory (1702–1975)
 Temasek Polytechnic, a public, further education college in Singapore
  (TP.HCM), Vietnam's largest city
 Tunjungan Plaza, a shopping center in Surabaya, Indonesia

Science and technology

Biology and medicine
 TP-003, an experimental anti-anxiety drug
 TP-13, an experimental anti-anxiety drug
 Triose phosphate, an intermediate metabolite in cellular respiration and photosynthesis

Other uses in science and technology

 .tp, East Timor's former Internet domain (1997–2015) 
 TP cable, in telecommunications
 Tense phrase, in linguistics and syntax
 Test pattern or test card, a broadcast television signal 
 time of perihelion passage in astronomy
 Throttle position sensor, an engine air-intake   sensor
 Trispyrazolylborate (Tp−), a chemical ligand (or binding agent)

Other uses
 .tp, East Timor's former Internet domain (1997–2015)
 т.р., thousand Russian rubles
 TP 52, a class of yacht used for racing
 Toilet paper
 Toilet papering, the act of throwing toilet paper over structures or vehicles
 Triple play, a fielding play in baseball
 Town panchayat, a type of local government in India

See also
 7TP, a Polish light tank of the Second World War